Murder in Big Horn is a true crime documentary miniseries, directed by Razelle Benally and Matthew Galkin. It follows Missing and murdered Indigenous women in Montana. It premiered on February 5, 2023, on Showtime.

Synopsis
The series follows missing and murdered Indigenous women in rural Montana, with families and journalists sharing their stories.

Episodes

Production
Showtime approached Matthew Galkin about directing a documentary revolving around Missing and murdered Indigenous women, Galkin then approached Razelle Benally about co-directing the project. Benally knew families affected by the violence and worked with the movement, and approached people who had already been vocal of their advocacy of their families stories. Benally and Galkin wanted to humanize the victims and tell their stories.

Release
The series had its world premiere at the 2023 Sundance Film Festival on January 22, 2023. It premiered on February 5, 2023, on Showtime.

Reception
On review aggregator Rotten Tomatoes, Murder in Big Horn has an approval rating of 85% based on 13 reviews, with an average rating of 7.50/10. Metacritic calculated an average of 66 out of 100 based on 9 reviews, indicating "generally favorable reviews".

References

External links
 
 

2023 American television series debuts
2023 American television series endings
2020s American documentary television series
Documentary television series about crime in the United States
English-language television shows
Showtime (TV network) original programming
True crime television series